Chris Xu may refer to:

 Chris Xu (table tennis) (born 1969), Chinese-born Canadian table tennis player
 Chris Jiashu Xu (born 1967), Chinese-born American real estate developer
 Chris Xu, the founder of retail shipping company Shein